Graeme R. Newman is an American scholar of criminal justice and Distinguished Teaching Professor at University at Albany. He is a recipient of J. Francis Finnegan Memorial Prize in Criminology.

Newman is the vice president of Center for Problem Oriented Policing and pioneered the establishment of the United Nations Crime and Justice Information Network. He is known for his research on crime prevention.

Books
 Newman, G. (1995), Just And Painful: A Case for Corporal Punishment of Criminals, Criminal Justice Pr
 Howard, G. and Newman, G. (2001), Varieties of Comparative Criminology, Brill
 Newman, G. (2008), The Punishment Response, Transaction Publishers
 Newman, G. (2018), Punishment and Privilege, 2nd ed. Independently published

References

External links
Graeme Newman - School of Criminal Justice - University at Albany

Living people
American legal scholars
University at Albany, SUNY faculty
University of Pennsylvania alumni
American criminologists
Scholars of criminal law
Year of birth missing (living people)